Aethiopsestis mufindiae is a moth in the family Drepanidae. It was described by Watson in 1965. It is found in Tanzania.

References

Endemic fauna of Tanzania
Moths described in 1965
Thyatirinae
Moths of Africa